Solontsovka is a rural locality (a settlement) in Abramovskoye Rural Settlement, Talovsky District, Voronezh Oblast, Russia. The population was 214 as of 2010. There are seven streets.

Geography 
Solontsovka is located 39 km east of Talovaya (the district's administrative centre) by road. Ternovsky is the nearest rural locality.

References 

Rural localities in Talovsky District